Seversk State Technological Academy (Russian: Северская государственная технологическая академия) is a post-secondary educational institution in the City of Seversk, Tomsk Oblast, Russia.  The school has 1,150 students, of whom 500 study full-time and 75 professors.  The current rector is Aleksandr Nikolaevich  Zhiganov.

History
The school was founded in 1959 as a branch of the Physics-Technological faculty of Tomsk Polytechnic University.

From 1996 to 2001, the school was known as the Seversk Technological Institute of Tomsk Polytechnic University.  Later, it became an independent institution called the Seversk State Technological Institute and in 2005, adopted its current name.

Academics
The school has four main faculties:
Management Technology
Higher Mathematics
Humanities and Social Sciences
Applied Informatics
System Management and Accounting
Economics
Electrical Engineering and Automation
Electrical Drive and Automation
Chair of Physics
Electronics and Automation of Physical Installations
Chair of Physics Education
Technological Faculty
Machines and Apparatus of Chemical Production)
Chemistry and Technology of Modern Energetics Materials
Technical Mechanics and Graphics
Foreign Languages
Continuing Education

There is also a division that provides re-training and continuing education to employees of the Siberian Group of Chemical Enterprises and a Distance Learning Faculty.

Foreign relations
The school has partnered with a number of foreign universities including University of Dortmund and University of Karlsruhe in Germany, Open University in the United Kingdom, Boston University and Massachusetts Institute of Technology, United States and Politecnico di Milano in Italy.

See also
List of institutions of higher learning in Russia
Education in Siberia

References

External links
University Home Page

Universities in Tomsk Oblast
Russia
Educational institutions established in 1959
1959 establishments in Russia
Moscow Engineering Physics Institute